Promontory Divide, elevation , is a ridge and mountain pass along the border between Custer and  Huerfano counties in southern Colorado, USA. Colorado State Highway 69 traverses the pass, which is in the southern part of the Wet Mountain Valley.

Watersheds
Antelope Creek drains the area to the north of the pass and Muddy Gulch, a tributary of the Huerfano River, drains the area to the south. Water from both sides of the pass eventually drains to the Arkansas River.

References

Mountain passes of Colorado
Landforms of Custer County, Colorado
Landforms of Huerfano County, Colorado
Transportation in Custer County, Colorado
Transportation in Huerfano County, Colorado
Ridges of Colorado